William Kalubi Mwamba (born 10 May 1992 in Kinshasa), better known by his stage name Damso, is a Belgian-Congolese rapper, singer, and songwriter. He is popular in France, where all of his albums were certified at least platinum.

Early life
Kalubi was born in Kinshasa, Zaire (present-day Democratic Republic of the Congo). When he was nine years old, he and his family left the country because of the bloody armed conflict and moved to Belgium. They eventually settled in Matonge, a largely Congolese neighborhood in Ixelles, Brussels. William's mother is Rose Marthe.

Education
After completing secondary school, Damso's parents encouraged him to continue his studies, and he pursued a degree in marketing and psychology. However, he began spending considerable time in recording studios, and his grades suffered. This led to a clash with his parents, especially his father, who had been a medical doctor in Kinshasa. "I was even kicked out of the house!" explained Damso. This became a major time of struggle for the artist, which led him to live in various squats of the city and led no choice for Damso to trade or sell his goods for money. The artist states: "I did marketing and psychology, but racism took a toll on my life choices. I never really felt accepted because of that. I tried to find jobs, I had interviews, but it never worked out. Maybe it's because of my height, I'm intimidating, I don't know. It's also what pushed me into illegal activities; I wasn't trying to be sly, I just needed CASH. All of this makes you angry, but it also makes you want to make your own choices. Working behind a desk with a boss who calls you a "dirty nigger" has never been an interest of mine. I didn't want to accept such treatment, just because I have to pay my rent at the end of the month. It motivated me."

Career
Damso started his rap career in 2006 by performing at local and underground events. At the start of his rap career, he formed rap collective OPG with childhood friend Dolfa. They later recruited Ducke, Lio Brown, and Rex. He released his first solo project Salle d'attente online as a free download in 2014. In collaboration with his band OPG, and significantly inspired by his older brother Mehdi Rais, he released his mixtape MMMXIII on 24 September 2014. Damso made his name in 2015 thanks to his song "Poseidon", which appears on Booba's OKLM mixtape. Following this, he joined Booba's 92i collective and signed with Universal Music. He made an appearance on Booba's album Nero Nemesis on the track "Pinocchio", in collaboration with Booba and rapper Gato Da Bato. Damso's verse was noted by the public and the media, increasing his popularity and widening his audience.

In France, all of Damso's albums have attained at minimum platinum certification.

On July 8, 2016, his first studio album, entitled Batterie Faible, was released on Booba's label: 92i Records. The project, fully mixed and recorded by Krisy, has been certified platinum in France selling more than 100,000 units.

His second album Ipséité was released on April 28, 2017, and was certified triple platinum in less than six months. The album is now certified diamond with over 900,000 cumulative album sales in France.

In 2018, Damso's third album Lithopedion was certified platinum within a week of its release and is now certified triple platinum. He won the best musicer awards.

In 2020, he released album QALF.
Which is now certified triple platinum.

Controversy
National soccer teams often commission musicians to create songs for big tournaments as a way of building morale and reflecting national identity. In 2018, the Belgian Football Association announced that it would hire Damso to prepare an anthem for its participation in that year's FIFA World Cup. However, the Belgian FA received strong criticism from the public and women rights group because of misogynist and sexist content of Damso's songs. In March 2018, it announced that it had ended the collaboration with Damso “by mutual agreement,” according to a statement. The association went on to say, “We especially wish to apologize to all those who felt offended, discriminated against or diminished by the choice of the artist in question.”

Discography

Albums

Mixtapes

Singles

As lead artist

*Did not appear in the official Belgian Ultratop 50 charts, but rather in the bubbling under Ultratip charts.

As featured artist

*Did not appear in the official Belgian Ultratop 50 charts, but rather in the bubbling under Ultratip charts.

Other charted or certified songs

References

1992 births
Living people
Belgian rappers
French-language singers of Belgium
Democratic Republic of the Congo emigrants to Belgium
People from Kinshasa
21st-century Belgian male singers
21st-century Belgian singers
21st-century rappers